Sweet Hollow Presbyterian Church Parsonage is a historic Presbyterian church parsonage at 152 Old Country Road in Melville, Suffolk County, New York. It was built about 1830 and is a -story, five-bay, gable-roofed residence.  The church is no longer extant.

It was added to the National Register of Historic Places in 1985.

References

Presbyterian churches in New York (state)
Churches on the National Register of Historic Places in New York (state)
Churches completed in 1830
Houses in Suffolk County, New York
Clergy houses in the United States
1830 establishments in New York (state)
National Register of Historic Places in Suffolk County, New York